Patrick Quentin, Q. Patrick and Jonathan Stagge were pen names under which Hugh Callingham Wheeler (19 March 1912 – 26 July 1987), Richard Wilson Webb (August 1901 – December 1966), Martha Mott Kelley (30 April 1906 – 2005) and Mary Louise White Aswell (3 June 1902 – 24 December 1984) wrote detective fiction. In some foreign countries their books have been published under the variant Quentin Patrick. Most of the stories were written by Webb and Wheeler in collaboration, or by Wheeler alone. Their most famous creation is the amateur sleuth Peter Duluth. In 1963, the story collection The Ordeal of Mrs. Snow was given a Special Edgar Award by the Mystery Writers of America.

History
In 1931, Martha Mott Kelley and Richard Wilson Webb collaborated on the detective novel Cottage Sinister. Kelley was known as Patsy (Patsy Kelly was a well-known character actress of that era) and Webb—an Englishman (born 1901 in Burnham-on-Sea, Somerset) who worked for a pharmaceutical company in Philadelphia—was known as Rick, so they created the pseudonym Q. Patrick by combining their nicknames—adding the Q "because it was unusual".

Webb and Kelley's literary partnership soon ended, with Kelley's marriage to Stephen Shipley Wilson. Webb continued to write under the Q. Patrick name, while looking for a new writing partner. Although he wrote two novels with the journalist and Harper's Bazaar editor Mary Louise Aswell, he would find his permanent collaborator in Hugh Wheeler, a Londoner who had moved to the US in 1934.

Wheeler's and Webb's first collaboration was published in 1936. That same year, they introduced two new pseudonyms: Murder Gone to Earth, the first novel featuring Dr. Westlake, was credited to Jonathan Stagge, a name they would continue to use for the rest of the Westlake series. A Puzzle for Fools introduced Peter Duluth and was signed Patrick Quentin. This would become their primary and most famous pen name, even though they also continued to use Q. Patrick until the end of their collaboration (particularly for Inspector Trant stories).

In the late 1940s, Webb's contributions gradually decreased due to health problems. From the 1950s and on, Wheeler continued writing as Patrick Quentin on his own, and also had one book published under his own name. In the 1960s and '70s, Wheeler achieved success as a playwright and librettist, and his output as Quentin Patrick slowed and then ceased altogether after 1965. However, Wheeler did write the book for the 1979 musical Sweeney Todd about a fictional London mass murderer, showing he had not altogether abandoned the genre.

Writing
The early Q. Patrick detective stories generally follow the Golden Age "whodunit" conventions, with elaborate puzzle mysteries reminiscent of Agatha Christie or John Dickson Carr. From the time when Wheeler joined the writing, the stories become more psychologically acute, with increasingly realistic, fleshed-out characters. In the 1940s, the stories start to move away from the traditional detective pattern: Puzzle for Fiends is a Hitchcockian thriller, Puzzle for Pilgrims a film noir in written form, and Run to Death a pulpy spy novel.

The majority of the Webb–Wheeler collaborations feature one of their recurring characters: Peter Duluth, a Broadway director, WWII veteran and recovering alcoholic who, with his wife Iris, always seems to stumble across murders; Inspector Timothy Trant of the New York City Police, a Princeton University-educated dandy whose remorseless investigations often seem to be aimed at some innocent person before he reveals his real target; and the country doctor, Dr. Hugh Cavendish Westlake with his daughter Dawn. When Webb bowed out on the writing, these characters disappeared or receded into the background.

The late Patrick Quentin novels are increasingly dark and brooding. Deceit and betrayal, particularly adultery, already a frequent theme, becomes even more central. Although at the end of the story the murder is solved, the impact of the crime, and the corruption uncovered in the investigation, remain.

A study of all the Q.Patrick/Patrick Quentin/Jonathan Stagge novels has appeared in French, Patrick Quentin: Du roman-probleme au Thriller Psychologique by Roland Lacourbe, Vincent Bourgeois, Phillippe Fooz and Michel Soupart (France: Semper Aenigma, 2016).

Legacy
At one time a relatively popular mystery writer (Francis Iles called Quentin "number one among American crime writers"), Quentin has largely fallen into obscurity in the US, his works out of print. He probably is better known in Scandinavia, where he used to be among the most famous detective writers, although his reputation is fading there as well.

A few of Quentin's stories have been filmed (see below), most notably the Peter Duluth mystery Black Widow, which was filmed under that title by Twentieth Century Fox in 1954 as a color Cinemascope feature. Van Heflin portrayed the Peter Duluth character, who for some reason was renamed Peter Denver.

Works variously by Richard Wilson Webb, Hugh Wheeler, Martha Mott Kelley and Mary Louise Aswell

As 'Q. Patrick'

Novels by Webb and Kelley 
 Cottage Sinister – 1931. Abridged version: Triple Detective, Winter 1948
 Murder at the Women's City Club – 1932 (also Death in the Dovecote)

Novels by Webb 
 Murder at the 'Varsity – 1933 (also Murder at Cambridge)

Novels by Webb and Aswell 
 S.S. Murder – 1933 
 The Grindle Nightmare – 1935 (also Darker Grows the Valley). Abridged version: Detective Novel Magazine, May 1947

Novels by Webb and Wheeler 
 Death Goes to School – 1936 
 Death for Dear Clara – 1937, with Inspector Trant
 The File on Fenton and Farr – 1938
 The File on Claudia Cragge – 1938, with Inspector Trant
 Death and the Maiden – 1939, with Inspector Trant
 Return to the Scene – 1941 (also Death in Bermuda), serialised in the U.K.: Woman, 26 July 1941, 2 August 1941, 9 August 1941, 16 August 1941, 23 August 1941, 30 August 1941, 6 September 1941 and 13 September 1941
 Danger Next Door – 1952
 The Girl on the Gallows – 1954

Short fiction by Webb and Wheeler
(FIRST KNOWN PUBLICATION ONLY)
Darker Grows the Valley. Mystery, May 1935
Killed by Time. Street & Smith's Detective Story Magazine, October 1935
The Dogs Do Bark. Street & Smith's Detective Story Magazine, November 1935
The Frightened Landlady. Street & Smith's Detective Story Magazine, December 1935
Call the Heart Home. Sketch, 18 December 1935
The Scarlet Circle. Street & Smith's Detective Story Magazine, January 1936
The Hated Woman. Street & Smith's Detective Story Magazine, February 1936
Murder or Mercy. Street & Smith's Detective Story Magazine, June 1936
The Jack of Diamonds. The American Magazine, November 1936
Death Goes to School. PUBLICATION UNKNOWN, 1936
Danger Next Door. Street & Smith's Detective Story Magazine, May 1937
The Lady Had Nine Lives. The American Magazine, August 1937
Exit Before Midnight. The American Magazine, October 1937. Serialised weekly in the U.K.: Woman Magazine, 4 to 25 January 1941
Death and the Maiden. American Weekly, 22 and 29 January 1939
Death for Dear Clara. Five-in-One Detective Magazine, June/July 1939
Another Man’s Poison. The American Magazine, January 1940
Death Rides the Ski-Tow. The American Magazine, April 1941. Serialised weekly in the U.K. as Death Rides the Ski Trail, Woman Magazine, 6 to 20 March 1943
Ordeal. Woman Magazine, 18 October 1941
Murder with Flowers. The American Magazine, December 1941
Portrait of a Murderer. Harper's Magazine, April 1942
Humphrey. This Week, 24 May 1942. Reprinted as “Cat’s Cradle”. Woman Magazine, 26 September 1942
Lest We Forget. Woman Magazine, 27 June 1942
The Woman Who Waited. The Shadow, January 1945

Short fiction by Wheeler
White Carnations. Collier's, 10 February 1945. Collected in The Cases of Lieutenant Timothy Trant (Trant)
The Plaster Cat. Mystery Book Magazine, July 1946. Collected in The Cases of Lieutenant Timothy Trant (Trant)
Murder at Cambridge. Thrilling Mystery Novel Magazine, January 1947
The Corpse in the Closet. This Week, 16 February 1947. Reprinted: Ellery Queen's Mystery Magazine, January 1948. Collected in The Cases of Lieutenant Timothy Trant (Trant)
This Way Out. Mystery Book Magazine, March 1947
Death on Saturday Night. Ellery Queens's Mystery Magazine. Collected in The Cases of Lieutenant Timothy Trant (Trant)
Love Comes to Miss Lucy. Ellery Queen's Mystery Magazine, April 1947
Footlights and Murder. This Week, 11 May 1947
Little Boy Lost Ellery Queen's Mystery Magazine, October 1947
Murder in One Scene. This Week, 2 May 1948
Mother, May I Go Out to Swim?. Ellery Queen's Mystery Magazine, July 1948
Farewell Performance. Ellery Queen's Mystery Magazine, September 1948
The Wrong Envelope. Mystery Book Magazine, 1948
Murder in the Alps. This Week, 20 February 1949
Death and the Maiden Detective Novel Magazine, Spring 1949. Reprinted: This Week, 26 May 1949
Who Killed the Mermaid?. This Week, 26 May 1949. Collected in The Cases of Lieutenant Timothy Trant (Trant)
Thou Lord See'st Me. Ellery Queen's Mystery Magazine, July 1949
The Case of the Plaster Cat. This Week, 3 September 1949
Town Blonde, Country Blonde. This Week, 16 October 1949
Woman of Ice. This Week, 30 October 1949. Collected in The Cases of Lieutenant Timothy Trant (Trant)
This Looks Like Murder. This Week, 30 April 1950. Collected in The Cases of Lieutenant Timothy Trant (Trant)
A Boy’s Will. Ellery Queen's Mystery Magazine, June 1950
Death on the Riviera. This Week, 30 July 1950
Death and Canasta. This Week, 15 October 1950
Night. This Week, 26 November 1950 (Death on Saturday Night)
This Will Kill You. Ellery Queen's Mystery Magazine, November 1950
Girl Overboard (book). Four-&-Twenty Bloodhounds (1950). Collected in The Cases of Lieutenant Timothy Trant (Trant)
All the Way to the Moon. Ellery Queen's Mystery Magazine, September 1951
Death before Breakfast. This Week, 11 March 1951. Collected in The Cases of Lieutenant Timothy Trant (Trant)
Glamorous Opening. This Week, 3 June 1951
Death at the Fair. (London) Evening Standard, 9 November 1951. Collected in The Cases of Lieutenant Timothy Trant (Trant)
The Pigeon Woman. Ellery Queen's Mystery Magazine, July 1952
Revolvers and Roses. This Week, 7 December 1952
The 'Laughing Man' Murders. The American Magazine, March 1953
Death on a First Night. Mackill's Mystery Magazine, May 1953. 
On the Day of the Rose Show. Ellery Queen's Mystery Magazine. Collected in The Cases of Lieutenant Timothy Trant (Trant)
Going...Going...Gone!. This Week, 10 May 1953. Collected in The Cases of Lieutenant Timothy Trant (Trant)
The Predestined. Britannia & Eve, 1 August 1953
The Red Balloon. Weird Tales, November 1953
Two Deadly Females. This Week, 3 April 1955
Lioness versus Panther. Ellery Queen's Mystery Magazine. Collected in The Cases of Lieutenant Timothy Trant (Trant)
The Fat Cat. Suspense, March 1959. Reprinted as The Fat Cat Which Sat on the Mat (Great Animal Stories No. 3). Aberdeen Evening Express, 18 and 19 October 1961

As 'Dick Callingham'

Short fiction by Webb and Wheeler
 ‘'Striking Silence'’. Street & Smith's Detective Story Magazine, February 1936
 ‘'Terror Keepers'’. Street & Smith's Detective Story Magazine, March 1936
 ‘'Frightened Killer'’. Street & Smith's Detective Story Magazine, May 1937

As 'Patrick Quentin'

Novels by Webb and Wheeler 
 A Puzzle for Fools – 1936 with Peter Duluth.
 Puzzle for Players – 1938 with Peter Duluth.
 Puzzle for Puppets – 1944 with Peter Duluth. Serialised weekly as “Ring around the Roses” as by Q Patrick. Woman magazine, 18 April to 9 May 1942. Filmed as Homicide for Three (1948) .
 Puzzle for Wantons – 1945 (also Slay the Loose Ladies)with Peter Duluth. Originally serialised as "Puzzle for Frauds". Woman Magazine (UK), 20 January to 10 March 1945
 Puzzle for Fiends – 1946 (also Love Is a Deadly Weapon)with Peter Duluth. Filmed in the UK as The Strange Awakening (1958), US title Female Friends . Serialised weekly in the U.K., Answers Magazine, 24 August 1946 to 8 February 1947
 Puzzle for Pilgrims – 1947 (also The Fate of the Immodest Blonde) with Peter Duluth.
 Run to Death – 1948 with Peter Duluth.
 The Follower – 1950 
 Black Widow – 1952 (also Fatal Woman) with Peter Duluth and Inspector Trant. Filmed as Black Widow (1954) .

Novels by Wheeler 
 My Son, the Murderer – 1954 (also The Wife of Ronald Sheldon)with Peter Duluth (briefly) and Inspector Trant.
 The Man with Two Wives – 1955. Serialised, Woman's Own Weekly from 16 June 1955, 23 June 1955, 30 June 1955, 7 July 1955, 14 July 1855, 21 July 1955, 28 July 1955 and 4 August 1955with Inspector Trant. Filmed as Tsuma Futari (1967)　by Shindo Kaneto .
 The Man in the Net – 1956 Filmed as The Man in the Net (1959) .
 Suspicious Circumstances – 1957
 Shadow of Guilt – 1959 with Inspector Trant.
 The Green-Eyed Monster – 1960 
 The Ordeal of Mrs. Snow – 1961 A short story collection; the title story was filmed for TV as an episode of The Alfred Hitchcock Hour, "The Ordeal of Mrs. Snow" (1964) .
 Family Skeletons – 1965 with Inspector Trant. Filmed for West German TV as Familienschande (1988) .

Short Story Collections by Webb and Wheeler
 The Puzzles of Peter Duluth – Crippen & Landru Publishers, 2016.  Short stories.
 The Cases of Lieutenant Trant – Crippen & Landru Publishers, 2020.  Short stories.
 Hunt in the Dark and Other Fatal Pursuits – Crippen & Landru Publishers, 2021.  Short stories.

Short fiction by Webb and Wheeler
 Honor the Valiant.This Week, 20 October 1940
 She Wrote Finis. Maclean’s Magazine, December 1940  – January 1941 (Trant)
 Witness for the Prosecution, Ellery Queen's Mystery Magazine, July 1946*

Short non-fiction by Wheeler
 Unlucky Lady. American Weekly, 10 May 1953

As 'Jonathan Stagge'

Novels by Webb and Wheeler 
 Murder Gone to Earth – 1936 (also The Dogs Do Bark)  – with Dr Hugh Westlake
 Murder or Mercy? – 1937 (also Murder by Prescription)  – with Dr Hugh Westlake
 The Stars Spell Death – 1939 (also Murder in the Stars)  – with Dr Hugh Westlake
 Turn of the Table – 1940 (also Funeral for Five). Serialised in US newspapers as The Table Talks  – with Dr Hugh Westlake
 The Yellow Taxi – 1942 (also Call a Hearse). Serialised in US newspapers as Riddle in Red  – with Dr Hugh Westlake
 The Scarlet Circle – 1943 (also Light from a Lantern)  – with Dr Hugh Westlake
 Death, My Darling Daughters – 1945 (also Death and the Dear Girls) 
 Death's Old Sweet Song – 1946
 The Three Fears – 1949

Novels by Hugh Wheeler
 The Crippled Muse – 1951

Novels by Mary Louise Aswell
 Far to Go – 1957

References
 Christian Henriksson's Mystery Author Bibliography Site. Bibliography, including short stories, and giving Swedish titles when present.
 Skyggespill: En dikter som spiller sjakk. Biography and discussion of works. In Norwegian.
 Gialloweb Bibliography. Complete bibliography, with all the Italian editions.

American mystery writers
20th-century American novelists
Edgar Award winners
Series of books
Collective pseudonyms
People from Burnham-on-Sea
American male novelists
20th-century American male writers